Grania: She-King of the Irish Seas is a 1986 historical fiction novel about Grace O'Malley, the so-called "Sea Queen of Connemara", by American-born Irish author Morgan Llywelyn. Llywelyn's novel is a heavily fictionalized account of O'Malley's life, with the author having created characters as needed for the plot of the story. The novel was the basis for the 2007 Broadway musical The Pirate Queen.

References 

1986 novels
Novels by Morgan Llywelyn
Historical novels
Cultural depictions of Irish women